An audiogram is a graph that shows the audible threshold for standardized frequencies as measured by an audiometer. The Y axis represents intensity measured in decibels and the X axis represents frequency measured in hertz. The threshold of hearing is plotted relative to a standardised curve that represents 'normal' hearing, in dB(HL). They are not the same as equal-loudness contours, which are a set of curves representing equal loudness at different levels, as well as at the threshold of hearing, in absolute terms measured in dB SPL (sound pressure level).

Audiograms are set out with frequency in hertz (Hz) on the horizontal axis, most commonly on a logarithmic scale, and a linear dBHL scale on the vertical axis.

For humans, normal hearing is between −10 dB(HL) and 15 dB(HL), although 0 dB from 250 Hz to 8 kHz is deemed to be 'average' normal hearing.

Hearing thresholds of humans and other mammals can be found with behavioural hearing tests or physiological tests used in audiometry. For adults, a behavioural hearing test involves a tester who presents tones at specific frequencies (pitches) and intensities (loudnesses).  When the testee hears the sound he or she responds (e.g., by raising a hand or pressing a button.  The tester records the lowest intensity sound the testee can hear.

With children, an audiologist makes a game out of the hearing test by replacing the feedback device with activity-related toys such as blocks or pegs. This is referred to as conditioned play audiometry. Visual reinforcement audiometry is also used with children. When the child hears the sound, he or she looks in the direction the sound came from and are reinforced with a light and/or animated toy. A similar technique can be used when testing some animals but instead of a toy, food can be used as a reward for responding to the sound.

Physiological tests do not need the patient to respond (Katz 2002). For example, when performing the brainstem auditory evoked potentials the patient's brainstem responses are being measured when a sound is played into their ear, or otoacoustic emissions which are generated by a healthy inner ear either spontaneously or evoked by an outside stimulus. 
In the US, the NIOSH recommends that people who are regularly exposed to hazardous noise have their hearing tested once a year, or every three years otherwise.

Measurement 
Audiograms  are produced using a piece of test equipment called an audiometer, and this allows different frequencies to be presented to the subject, usually over calibrated headphones, at any specified level. The levels are, however, not absolute, but weighted with frequency relative to a standard graph known as the minimum audibility curve which is intended to represent a 'normal' hearing. This is not the best threshold found for all subjects, under ideal test conditions, which is represented by around 0 Phon or the threshold of hearing on the equal-loudness contours, but is standardised in an ANSI standard to a level somewhat higher at 1 kHz. There are several definitions of the minimal audibility curve, defined in different international standards, and they differ significantly, giving rise to differences in audiograms according to the audiometer used. The ASA-1951 standard for example used a level of 16.5 dB(SPL) at 1 kHz whereas the later ANSI-1969/ISO-1963 standard uses 6.5 dB(SPL), and it is common to allow a 10 dB correction for the older standard.

Audiograms and types of hearing loss

"Conventional" pure tone audiometry (testing frequencies up to 8 kHz) is the basic measure of hearing status.  For research purposes, or early diagnosis of age-related hearing loss, ultra-high frequency audiograms (up to 20 kHz), requiring special audiometer calibration and headphones, can be measured.

Different symbols indicate which ear the response is from and what type of response it is.  Results of air conduction audiometry (in which the signals are presented to the ear through headphones, which create vibrations in the air) are reported using circles for the right ear and Xs for the left ear. Results of bone conduction audiometry (in which signals are presented using a vibrator which creates vibrations in the temporal bones of the head in order to bypass the outer and middle ear and test the inner ear and auditory nerve alone) are reporting using brackets.  The open edge of the bracket indicates the ear tested, with < or [ representing a right bone conduction threshold and > or ] representing a left bone conduction threshold.  When colors are used on an audiogram, red indicates the right ear and blue indicates the left ear.

In adults, normal hearing is typically defined as thresholds of 25 dB HL or better (lower).  Thresholds of 30 dB HL and above indicate hearing loss.  

The configuration of thresholds on an audiogram can often help determine the cause(s) of the hearing loss.  For example, aging typically leads to hearing thresholds which get poorer as test frequencies get higher.  Noise induced hearing loss is typically characterized by a "notch" in the audiogram, with the poorest threshold occurring between 3000 and 6000 Hz (most often 4000 Hz) and better thresholds at lower and higher frequencies. 

Hearing impairment may also be the result of certain diseases such as CMV or Ménière's disease and these can be diagnosed from the shape of the audiogram.  Otosclerosis results in an audiogram with significant loss at all frequencies, often of around 40 dB(HL).  A deficiency particularly around 2 kHz (termed a Carhart notch in the audiogram) is characteristic of either otosclerosis or a congenital ossicular anomaly.  Ménière's disease results in a severe loss at low frequencies.

Constraints 
Audiograms are unable to measure hidden hearing loss, which is the inability to distinguish between sounds in loud environments such as restaurants. Hidden hearing loss is caused by synaptopathy in the cochlea, as opposed to sensorineural hearing loss caused by hair cell dysfunction. Audiograms are designed to "estimate the softest sounds the patient can detect", and are not reflective of the loud situations that cause difficulties for people with hidden hearing loss. Audiograms may not reflect losses of nerve fibers that respond to loud sounds, key to understanding speech in noisy environments. Research suggests a number of other measures, such as electrocochleography, speech-in-noise perception, and frequency following response, may be more useful.

See also
 Hearing range
 Equal-loudness contour
 Minimum audibility curve
 Articulation index
 Pure tone audiometry
 Hearing (sense)
 Audiology
 Audiometry
 A-weighting

References

Further reading
 Gotfrit, M (1995) Range of human hearing [online] Available from https://web.archive.org/web/20160304000057/http://www.sfu.ca/sca/Manuals/ZAAPf/r/range.html Zen Audio Project [28th Feb 2007]
 Katz, J (2002)5th ed. Clinical Audiology Lippen-Cott Williams and Wilkins
 Rubel, E. Popper, A. Fay, R (1998) Development of the Auditory System New York: Springer-Verlag inc.

Hearing
Audiology